Abdullah Al-Jumah (Arabic: عبدالله الجمعة ) is a 2013 Saudi Arabian #1 best-selling author of the book "Tales of a Saudi in Europe". Al-Jumah's influence in Arabic travel literature and social media made him one of the most powerful young Arabs, according to Arabian Business.

Following the book release, Al-Jumah quickly began making appearances on TV as a media personality and brand ambassador for Cartier and Infiniti. He is well-known in the Middle East region for his various global "flashpacking" adventures, in once instance travelling 1200 kilometers across India in a rickshaw.

Beyond the bestseller book, many of Abdullah's adventures have been televised and distributed widely across social media.

Career and background

Al-Jumah graduated from King Saud University with a degree in Law. After that, he attended Manchester University and acquired a Pre-Law diploma and an LLM. In 2013, Al-Jumah attended
Harvard Law School and was appointed as a law school lecturer at King Saud University in Riyadh. Later he worked as a legal counsel for the Ministry of Petroleum and Mineral Resources in Saudi Arabia.

References 

Living people
Saudi Arabian short story writers
Saudi Arabian media personalities
20th-century travel writers
Harvard Law School alumni
1987 births